H. C. Westermann (Horace Clifford "Cliff" Westermann) (December 11, 1922 – November 3, 1981) was an American sculptor and printmaker. His sculptures frequently incorporated traditional carpentry and marquetry techniques. From the late 1950s until his death in 1981, Westermann worked with a number of materials and formal devices to address a range of personal, literary, artistic, and pop-cultural references. The artist's sculptural oeuvre is distinguished by its intricate craftsmanship, in which wood, metal, glass, and other materials are laboriously hand-tooled, and by its ability to convey an offbeat, often humorous, individualistic sensibility.

Westermann's sculptures reveal not only the influence of craft traditions, but also of varied art historical precedents. The artist's ability to convey subtle and uncanny effects through the presentation of seemingly simple objects has often led critics to compare his work to that of Surrealist-inspired artists such as Joseph Cornell. However, Westermann's work encompasses elements from a broad and diverse range of artistic practices, including Assemblage, Dada, and Folk Art. His sculptures, moreover, point to minimal and post-minimal art of the late 1960s and beyond, in terms of their rigorous craftsmanship, formal sophistication, unconventional use of materials, and sense of humor.

Biography
Horace Clifford (H.C.) Westermann was born in Los Angeles, California in December 1922.  His father of the same name was an accountant.  From an early age H.C. Westermann demonstrated a natural talent and aptitude for the arts, specifically sculpting.  He designed and ultimately created his personal scooters and toys.  Eventually, he even contributed a small addition to his parents’ home.

After graduating from High School, Westermann briefly enrolled in Los Angeles City College and later took a job in the Pacific Northwest as a rail worker in logging camps.
In 1942, at the outbreak of World War II, he enlisted in the US Marine Corps at age twenty and was stationed aboard the USS Enterprise as an anti-aircraft gunner.  
The USS Enterprise was heavily involved in the Pacific campaign and took part in many critical battles, such as the Battle of Midway and the Guadalcanal campaign.  The ship bore the brunt of numerous Japanese Kamikaze attacks, horrific events that informed much of H.C. Westermann's later work.  Additionally, Westermann witnessed the destruction of the USS Franklin and the loss of over 800 men.  He would later reflect on the experience and described “the horrible smell of death…”  The brutal and horrific naval warfare experienced by Westermann is reflected in most of his work, especially his “Death Ships” series.

Immediately following the end of the war, Westermann formed a two-man acrobatics act with the United Service Organization (USO) and toured the Far East for a year, where he met his first wife, June Laford, a showgirl performing in Shanghai.  Together, Westermann and his new bride moved to Chicago and had a son, Gregory.  
Westermann then enrolled in the School of the Art Institute of Chicago in 1947 to study Applied Art.  He also took a job in the Applied Arts Department to financially support his new family.  Three years later, June divorced Westermann, after which he grew increasingly disillusioned with mainstream art.

Feeling bitter and fed up with the current state of art in America, as well as unhappy with his current situation, Westermann reenlisted in the US Marine Corps in 1950 as an infantryman in the Korean War.  He entered the conflict still patriotic from his service in World War II, yet due to the military blunders and senseless violence he witnessed, he left the conflict with a drastically different set of values of America's place in the world.  These anti-military views would later be reflected in his future works.

After he left the Marine Corps at the end of the war, Westermann again enrolled in the School of the Art Institute of Chicago under the G.I. Bill to study Fine Art.  Although he lacked the experience working as an artist that many of his younger peers held, Westermann was very well liked by his classmates and staff alike for his maturity and real world experiences.  To complement his tuition from the G.I. Bill, he learned the craft of woodworking and began to take on work as a carpenter.  He quickly established a reputation for quality work, yet his superiors urged him to value speed over craftsmanship, a conflict of values that led to him leaving carpentry for work and becoming a sculptor rather than a handyman. He continued his work until his death on November 3, 1981.

Works
It was the skills gained during his stint as a carpenter and his constant commitment to excellence that quickly garnered Westermann a reputation as one of the top sculptors of his time.  His works were never clearly defined by the prevailing artistic movements of the day, Surrealism and Figurative Expressiveness.  At first, his works were viewed simply as a form of social commentary, which to an extent, they were.  Yet Westermann never provided any meaning or subjective interpretation to his various works, stating "It puzzles me, too," when asked about the meaning of one of his sculptures.  This lack of a defined underlying movement led to Westermann's work being closely associated with Expressionism, while still drawing on Surrealist notions.

His works reflected this lack of unity in definition as well as form, as Westermann produced a wide array of works, from sculptures to lithographs, using materials ranging from paper and plywood to brass and lead.  Yet all his works reflected a common theme, shaped by his wartime experiences.  In a letter to a friend, Westermann describes a situation he experienced aboard the USS Enterprise in the early days of the Pacific campaign.  He was strapped into an anti-aircraft gun emplacement on the stern of the ship when they came under attack by Japanese aircraft.  A kamikaze pilot streaked towards the ship, prompting Westermann to fire upon, hit, and consequentially deflect the aircraft into the front of his ship, where he was powerless to watch it impact and explode the bow as he was strapped to the stern.  In this letter, Westermann goes on to explain that this memory, and many more like it, were still vividly ingrained in his mind.

This brutal vision of the human condition stuck with Westermann and resulted in his very bleak and anti-militaristic worldview: that everyone is alone in a world run by events beyond anyone's control.  The clearest depiction of this philosophy is seen in his aforementioned “Death Ships” series, a collection of sculptures and painting depicting bombed out husks of ships, usually set aflame, surrounded by ominous shark fins in the ocean.  
	
Even his later works retain this same theme of human helplessness, as they usually revolve around some scenario involving impending doom for the subject.  Adding to this common theme, Gregory, Westermann's son, enlisted in the Marines and served in the Vietnam War, a decision that Westermann strongly opposed, as he did the war.  Seeing his son serve in such a conflict only resulted in strengthening his own anti-militaristic views further.  His “Antimobile” work also took on a contemptuous anti-materialism tone, which is seen in his growingly anti-consumerism views.  Westermann criticized the growing lack of craftsmanship in modern industry and the increase of machine made products.  He mentioned the “depersonalization of society by the machine” as a major influence of his adult artistic career.  In contrast, his works all bear the same meticulous attention to detail and overall high levels of personal craftsmanship.  Every single piece of one of Westermann's sculptures is hand filed and finished, with the same attention to detail given to the inner, unseen components as the outer finish.

As mentioned before, a major distinction of Westermann's works is his excruciating level of precision and craftsmanship, as well as his predilection for dovetailed corners and laminated wood in his final products.  Nor did he ever confine himself to just one set of materials.  Westermann experimented with all manner of wood, metal, laminate, synthetic materials such as rubber, and more.  The viewer is met with the sense that every individual material is treated as a precious commodity.  Nothing is wasted and everything holds an integral share of the finished sculpture.

In terms of subject matter and style, Westermann also held a plethora of techniques.  In his array of sculptures and paintings, he relied on dry humor as much as strong visual images and bristling social commentary.  The clearest depiction of this is his work “Walnut Box-1964,” which is a small wooden box constructed of walnut and filled with real walnuts.  This marks a clear transition from his usual ambiguous and enigmatic style, yet still retains the same level of craftsmanship seen in each of Westermann's sculptures.

He became well known for combining existential allusions with distinctive dry wit in a sculpture built to the highest standard of detail.  What emerged from Westermann's workshop was a piece unlike anything else seen at the time.  His contemporaries held Westermann and his works in very high regard, even if some critics did not.  For the most part, his work was very well received by critics and the public alike.
 Untitled (in the manner of Salvador Dalí), about 1948
 Theatrical Worlds Spirit after Bernardino Jacobi, about 1949
 Reluctant Acrobat, 1949 (Honolulu Museum of Art)
 A Soldier's Dream (sculpture), 1955 (Honolulu Museum of Art)
 Dismasted Ship, 1956
 Ensor's Mother, 1956 (Smart Museum of Art)
 Untitled (“Unusual Physician”), 1957
 He Whore, 1957
 Memorial to the Idea of Man If He Was an Idea, 1958
 Mad House, 1958
 Burning House, 1958 (Smart Museum of Art)
 Battle of Little Big Horn, 1959
 Angry Young Machine, 1959
 Destructive Machine from Under the Sea, 1959
 Hard of Hearing Object (sculpture), 1961 (Honolulu Museum of Art)
 Disasters in the Sky #2, 1962
 Machine for Calculating Risk, 1962
 Clean Air, 1964
 Walnut Box, 1964
 Antimobile, 1965
 Korean KAI ASH, 1965
 Death Ship of No Port, 1967
 Green Planet (Green Planet π), 1967
 Woman from Indianapolis (Columbia, Missouri), 1967
 See America First – a series, 1968
 Untitled (This Great Rock was Buried Once for a Million Years) (sculpture), 1968 (Honolulu Museum of Art)
 Hammer in Box, 1970
 An Affair in the Islands (watercolor), 1972 (Honolulu Museum of Art)
 U.F.O. Landing in Africa (sculpture), 1974 (Honolulu Museum of Art)
 The Connecticut Ballroom, 1975–76
 H.C.W.  (Poster Project) (watercolor), 1977 (Honolulu Museum of Art)
 Escape Down the Still River (watercolor), 1979 (Honolulu Museum of Art)
 Woman Descending into Paradise (watercolor), 1979 (Honolulu Museum of Art)
 They Couldn't Put “Humpty Dumpty” Back Together Again (sculpture), 1980 (Honolulu Museum of Art)
 Jack of Diamonds, 1981

Westermann was subject to his first major museum retrospective in November 1968 at LACMA an expanded version of which traveled to the Museum of Contemporary Art Chicago.

Westermann was subject to his second major museum retrospective in May 1978 at the Whitney Museum touring to SFMOMA, the Seattle Art Museum. Des Moines Art Center, and the New Orleans Museum of Art.

Westermann was subject to his third major museum retrospective in June 2001 at the Museum of Contemporary Art Chicago traveling to the Hirshhorn Museum and Sculpture Garden, Museum of Contemporary Art, Los Angeles and the Menil Collection.

Westermann is the subject of a major retrospective (1955–1981) at the Fondazione Prada, Milan, October 20, 2017 – January 15, 2018

See also

References
 Haskell, Barbara. H.C. Westermann. New York: Whitney Museum of American Art, 1978.
 Adrian, Dennis. "See America First": The Prints of H. C. Westermann. Chicago: Smart Museum of Art, 2001.

External links
 2001 H.C. Westermann Retrospective at MCA
 1969 H.C. Westermann Retrospective at MCA
 H.C. Westermann at MoMA
 H.C. Westermann at Art Institute Chicago
 H.C. Westermann at LACMA
 H.C. Westermann at MCA
 NYT H.C. Westermann Obituary
 H.C. Westermann at Venus Over Manhattan
 H.C. Westermann Documentary
 MOCA Essay on H.C. Westermann

1922 births
1981 deaths
United States Marine Corps personnel of World War II
Assemblage artists
School of the Art Institute of Chicago alumni
United States Marines
20th-century American sculptors
20th-century American male artists
American male sculptors
20th-century American printmakers